Hermann Friedrich Stannius (15 March 1808, Hamburg – 15 January 1883, Sachsenberg near Schwerin) was a German anatomist, physiologist and entomologist. He specialised in the insect order Diptera especially the family Dolichopodidae.

Works 

Entomology

 De speciebus nonnullis Mycethophila vel novis vel minus cognitis.Bratislava, 1831. 
 Die europischen Arten der Zweyfluglergattung Dolichopus. Isis Oken 1831: 28–68, 122–144, 248–271, 1831.
Beiträge zur Entomologie, besondere in Bezug auf Schlesien, gemeinschaftlich mit Schummel. Breslau, 1832.
Über den Einfluss der Nerven auf den Blutumlauf. [Froriep's] Notizen aus dem Gebiete der Natur- und Heilkunde, 1833, 36: 246–248.
Ueber einige Missbildungen an Insekten. [Müller's] Archiv für Anatomie, Physiologie und wissenschaftliche Medizin, Berlin, 1835: 295–310.

Medical and Physiology

Allgemeine Pathologie. Berlin, I, 1837.
Ueber die Einwirkung des Strychnins auf das Nervensystem. Archiv für Anatomie, Physiologie und wissenschaftliche Medizin, Berlin, 1837: 223–236.
Ueber Nebennieren bei Knorpelfischen. Archiv für Anatomie, Physiologie und wissenschaftliche Medizin, Berlin, 1839: 97-101.
Ueber krankhafte Verschliessung grösserer Venenstämme. Berlin, 1839.
Ueber Lymphhezen der Vögel. Archiv für Anatomie, Physiologie und wissenschaftliche Medizin, Berlin, 1843: 449–452.
Ueber den Bau des Delphingehirns. Rostock, 1845. 
Abhandlungen aus dem Gebiet der Naturwissenschaften, Hamburg, 1846, I: 1-16.
Bemerkungen über das Verhältniss der Ganoiden zu den Clupeiden.Rostock, 1846. 
Beiträge zur Kenntniss der amerikanischen Manati’s. Rostock, 1846.
Lehrbuch der vergleichenden Anatomie der Wirbeltiere.2 volumes, Berlin, Veit & Co.,1846-1848. 2nd edition, 1852. 
Carl Theodor Ernst von Siebold (1804-1885) wrote the first volume, Stannius the second.
Untersuchungen ueber Muskelreizbarkeit. Archiv für Anatomie, Physiologie und wissenschaftliche Medizin, Berlin, 1847: 443–462. Also 1849: 588–592.
Versuch über die Function der Zungennerven.Archiv für Anatomie, Physiologie und wissenschaftliche Medizin, Berlin, 1848.
Beiträge zur Geschichte des Enchondroms.Archiv für Anatomie, Physiologie und wissenschaftliche Medizin, Berlin, 1848.
Das peripherische Nervensystem der Fische, anatomisch und physiologisch untersucht. Rostock, 1849.
Ueber eine der Thymus entsprechende Drüse bei Knochenfischen.Archiv für Anatomie, Physiologie und wissenschaftliche Medizin, Berlin, 1850.
Ueber Theilung der Primitivröhren in den Stämmen, Aesten und Zweigen der Nerven.Archiv für physiologische Heilkunde, Stuttgart, 1850; IX.
Versuche über die Ausscheidung der Nieren. Archiv für physiologische Heilkunde, Stuttgart, 1850; IX.
Ueber die Wirkung der Digitalis und des Digitalin. 
Archiv für physiologische Heilkunde, Stuttgart, 1851, 10: 177–209.
Zwei Reihen physiologischer Versuche. Archiv für Anatomie, Physiologie und wissenschaftliche Medizin, Berlin, 1852: 85-100. Partial translation in John Farquhar Fulton's (1899-1960) Selected Readings in the History of Physiology, 2nd. Edition, 1966: 59–60.
Untersuchungen über Leistungsfähigkeit der Muskeln und Todesstarre. Archiv für physiologische Heilkunde, Stuttgart, 1852; XI. 
Beobachtungen über Verjüngungsvorgänge im thierischen Organismus. Rostock, 1853.

References 
 Fieber. Article in Rudolf Wagner, editor: Handwörterbuch der Physiologie mit Rücksicht auf physiologische Pathologie. 
Braunschweig, 1842–1853.
J. Pagel: Biographisches Lexicon der hervorragenden Ärzte aller Zeiten und Völker. Berlin-Wien, 1934; 2nd edition, volume V, page 390.
Wilhelm Stieda:Hermann Stannius und die Universität Rostock 1837–1854. Jahrbuch des Vereins für mecklenburgische Geschichte und Altertumskunde, 1928, 93: 1-36.
Richard N. Wegner:Zur Geschichte der anatomischen Forschung an der Universität Rostock. Wiesbaden, 1917, pp. 127–128.
Axel Wilhelmi:Die mecklenburgischen Ärzte von den ältesten Zeiten bis zur Gegewart. Schwerin, 1901: 107–108.

External links 
 Stannius, Friedrich Hermann (Allgemeine Deutsche Biographie)
 whonamedit

Dipterists
French entomologists
1808 births
1883 deaths